Orléans is a provincial electoral district in eastern Ontario, Canada. It elects one member to the Legislative Assembly of Ontario. Before the 2018 election, it was known as Ottawa—Orléans.

History
It was created in 1999 from Prescott and Russell, Carleton East and Ottawa—Rideau. The electoral district was initially named Carleton—Gloucester, and the June 1999 provincial election was conducted by Elections Ontario under that name, but it was known as Ottawa—Orleans by the time of the October 2003 provincial election.

When it was created, the riding consisted of that part of the former city of Gloucester south of a line following Limebank Road to Leitrim Road to the Canadian Pacific Railway to Lester Road to Conroy Road, and east of a line following Green's Creek to the Queensway to Montreal Road to Blair Road to Innes Road to a transmission line and that part of the city of Cumberland north of Innes Road and west of Trim Road.

For the 2007 election, the riding was redefined to consist of that part of Ottawa within a line running along Green's Creek to the Queensway to Montreal Road to Blair Road to Innes Road to a transmission line to Highway 417 to Boundary Road to Wall Road to Trim Road to Regional Road 174 to Cardinal Creek.

For the 2018 election, the riding was renamed Orléans, and lost the neighbourhood of Beacon Hill South from Ottawa—Vanier, and will gain the Cardinal Creek area from Glengarry—Prescott—Russell and the rural area surrounding Carlsbad Spring from parts of Glengarry—Prescott—Russell and Nepean—Carleton.

Members of Provincial Parliament

Election results

2007 electoral reform referendum

References

External links
Map of riding for 2018 election

Provincial electoral districts of Ottawa